Mackenzie Lintz (born November 22, 1996) is an American film and television actress. She is known for playing Norrie Calvert-Hill on the CBS television drama Under the Dome.

Life
She comes from a family of actors, including her mother, Kelly Lintz, and her three younger siblings, Madison Lintz, Matt Lintz, and Macsen Lintz. She attended Covenant Christian Academy in Cumming, Georgia. Mackenzie, a lifelong Auburn fan, enrolled in 2014 as a freshman at Auburn University in Auburn, Alabama.

Career
Lintz first auditioned for the role of Mattie Ross in the remake of True Grit by the Coen brothers. She was cast in an episode of Lifetime's Drop Dead Diva as well. In late 2011, she was cast in a minor role on The Hunger Games playing a tribute girl from District 8.

In May 2013, she auditioned for the role of Norrie Calvert-Hill in another book-to feature remake, Under the Dome, and was subsequently cast, portraying the role through all three seasons of the series.

In February 2014, she was nominated for the Best Performance by a Younger Actor in a Television Series award at the 40th Saturn Awards.

Filmography

Awards and nominations

References

External links

1996 births
21st-century American actresses
American film actresses
Living people
American television actresses
Actresses from California
Auburn University alumni